Music Meister (Darius Chapel) is a fictional character created by Mike Jelenic and James Tucker who first appeared in "Mayhem of the Music Meister!", an episode of the animated television series Batman: The Brave and the Bold, voiced by Neil Patrick Harris. The character later appeared in the comic book sequel to the series of the same name, published by DC Comics.

The first live-action version of the character appeared in "Duet", a crossover between the live-action television series Supergirl and The Flash, portrayed by Darren Criss.

Fictional character biography

Batman: The Brave and the Bold 
The Music Meister, a villain capable of controlling others through song, first appeared in the Batman: The Brave and the Bold episode "Mayhem of the Music Meister!", voiced by Neil Patrick Harris. In order to hijack a United Nations communications satellite, he induces Black Manta, Gorilla Grodd, Clock King (who were there to steal the satellite themselves), Black Canary, Green Arrow, and Aquaman (there to stop the other villains) to commit the crime for him, launching it into space after they install a device inside it. ("I'm The Music Meister") During the song, Music Meister relates his origin:

When Batman intervenes, Music Meister orders his thralls to attack the hero, which they do in a dance style reminiscent of West Side Story. His plan successful, the Meister escapes by forcing his captives to dance towards the rocket blast, leaving Batman to rescue them rather than apprehend him. Meister flees to an empty opera house where, in a reference to Phantom of the Opera, he plays the organ to a cardboard audience. Batman tries to capture him in a cross-town chase, but Meister releases inmates and villains from Iron Heights Penitentiary and Arkham Asylum ("Drives Us Bats"). Having heard Black Canary sing about her unrequited love for Batman ("If Only"), the Meister falls for her, but not enough to give up villainy. Canary, in turn, firmly rejects him. Meister captures Black Canary and Batman and puts them in a death trap ("Death Trap"). However, they escape just as Music Meister uses the satellite to hypnotize the world with his music ("The World Is Mine"). When Black Canary becomes his slave, Batman tricks her into singing as high as he. He then seizes the Meister's microphone and uses the satellite to transmit Canary's sonic scream to break the mind control and defeat the Music Meister.

Batman: The Brave and the Bold (comics) 
The Music Meister later appeared in Batman: The Brave and the Bold #16 (April 2012). After Bat-Mite became instantly infatuated with Batgirl and tried to impress her with his magic, conjuring up scenarios from the comic books he has read, he teleported the Music Meister, Pied Piper, and The Fiddler for entertainment. The Music Meister tried to take control of Bat-Mite, but was knocked out before his powers could take effect.

DC Pride 2022 
The Music Meister made his first canon appearance in the one-shot DC Pride 2022 as a villain to Robin (Damian Wayne) and Green Arrow (Connor Hawke). His real name is Darius Chapel.

Powers, abilities, and equipment 
The Music Meister is a metahuman with the ability to cause every living being who hears his voice to burst into singing and dancing as though they were in a musical. In this hypnotic state, they are compelled to obey the Meister's commands, including those that endanger themselves. His influence is effective even when he is several feet away or in another room. The effects of his vocal hypnosis can be blocked out using ear plugs. The deaf and the hearing impaired are also immune to his powers. Victims recover their normal faculties within moments after the Meister departs or is rendered unconscious. In addition, he appears to have the uncanny ability to change his outfits extremely quickly, each of which represent different eras in music history, such as Elvis Presley's leisure suit and Cab Calloway's zoot suit.

Music Meister carries a rod-shaped weapon resembling a conductor's baton that fires energy blasts shaped like musical scores. For transportation, he rides a fast, highly maneuverable scooter in the shape of two beamed eighth notes.

In other media

Television 

 A similar character called the Minstrel appears in the 1966 Batman live-action series episodes "The Minstrel's Shakedown" and "Barbecued Batman?", portrayed by Van Johnson. Also an enemy of Batman, he is an electronics genius who played a lute and would frequently sing before, during, and/or after his illegal activities. He also refused to participate in "BatFights" as he detested physical violence.
 A similarly named villain called Music Master appears in the Justice League episode "Legends", voiced by Udo Kier. This character hails from an alternate universe, in which he serves as a nemesis of that world's heroic team, the Justice Guild of America. Music Master shares many similar characteristics with the Music Meister, though the former is meant to be evocative of the Fiddler.
 A variation of the Music Meister appears on The CW's live-action series Supergirl and The Flash, portrayed by Darren Criss. He is introduced in the conclusion of the Supergirl episode "Star-Crossed", as a prisoner of unknown origin in the Department of Extranormal Operations (DEO)'s custody. He hypnotizes Kara into a coma, then uses her inter-dimensional extrapolator to escape to Earth-1. In The Flash episode "Duet", Kara's allies bring her to Barry Allen's team on Earth-1, but the Music Meister traps Barry and Kara in a shared dream where they are singers in a 1940s gangster / musical film. Once Barry and Kara free themselves of the dream with help from their friends, the Meister reveals himself as an extra-dimensional being and fan of theirs who brought them together to teach them a lesson in love before leaving.
 A variation of the Music Meister appears in the Harley Quinn episode "It's a Swamp Thing", voiced by Larry Owens. This version is African American and inspired by R&B instead of musical theater, and provides relationship counseling to Batman and Catwoman.

Film 
 The Music Meister appears as a background character in the animated film Scooby-Doo! & Batman: The Brave and the Bold.

Video games 
 The Music Meister appears as a playable character in Lego Batman 3: Beyond Gotham, voiced by Troy Baker.
 The Music Meister appears as a playable character in Lego DC Super-Villains, voiced by John Paul Karliak.

References 

DC Comics supervillains
DC Comics titles
Batman: The Brave and the Bold
Animated human characters
DC Comics metahumans
Fictional characters who can manipulate sound
Fictional hypnotists and indoctrinators
DC Comics television characters
Fictional singers
Fictional dancers
Television characters introduced in 2009